The Players Tour Championship 2012/2013 – Event 3 was a professional minor-ranking snooker tournament that took place between 5–9 September 2012 at the South West Snooker Academy in Gloucester, England.

Rod Lawler won the first professional title of his 22-year career by defeating Marco Fu 4–2 in the final.

Prize fund and ranking points
The breakdown of prize money and ranking points of the event is shown below:

1 Only professional players can earn ranking points.

Main draw

Preliminary rounds

Round 1 
Best of 7 frames

Round 2 
Best of 7 frames

Main rounds

Top half

Section 1

Section 2

Section 3

Section 4

Bottom half

Section 5

Section 6

Section 7

Section 8

Finals

Century breaks 

139  Alfie Burden
138, 129, 102  Michael White
136  Stephen Lee
134  Alan McManus
130, 114, 114  Rod Lawler
130  Barry Hawkins
128  Ryan Day
124, 113  Michael Holt
124, 106, 105  Robert Milkins
123  Stuart Bingham
119, 116  Joe Swail
117, 116, 116, 114, 105, 102  Marco Fu
117  Mark Selby
115  Chen Zhe
113, 108, 103  Dominic Dale
112  Kyren Wilson

112  Mark Allen
108, 107, 105, 100  Fergal O'Brien
108  Passakorn Suwannawat
107, 100  Mark Joyce
107, 100  Jamie Cope
106  Liam Highfield
106  James Wattana
105  Luca Brecel
105  Jamie Jones
103  Matthew Stevens
102  Joe Perry
101  Mark Davis
101  Simon Bedford
100, 100  Ding Junhui
100  Judd Trump
100  Martin Gould

References

External links 
UKPTC3: Picture Perfect at Pro Snooker Blog

3
2012 in English sport